Thaumatogryllus conanti is a nocturnal species of cricket endemic to the island of Nihoa, where it is found in Devil's Slide, a narrow ravine. It is named after Sheila Conant, the scientist who discovered it in the 1980s. Including T. conanti, there are only four known species in the genus Thaumatogryllus, which is endemic to Hawaii. Another species is found only in lava tubes on the Island of Hawaii.

Island gigantism is mostly found in plants and animals on tiny, remote islands. This is because largeness provides a survival advantage. Usually, larger size makes it harder to escape from predators, but in these cases, there are none. This insect probably lost the capacity for flight in exchange for larger size.

References

N. Evenhuis and L. Eldredge, Natural History of Nihoa and Necker Islands, Bishop Museum Press, Honolulu, 2004.
M. Rauzon, Isles of Refuge: Wildlife and History of the Northwestern Hawaiian Islands, University of Hawaii Press, Honolulu, 2001.

Tree crickets
Endemic fauna of Nihoa
Insects of Hawaii
Insects described in 1994